Beauchastel is a commune in the Ardèche department in the Auvergne-Rhône-Alpes region of southern France.

The inhabitants of the commune are known as Beauchastellois or Beauchastelloises.

Geography
Beauchastel is located some 10 km south by south-west of Valence and 20 km north-east of Privas. Access to the commune is by the D86 road from Charmes-sur-Rhône in the north which passes through the commune and continues south to La Voulte-sur-Rhône. The D86E branches from the D86 at the northern communal border and goes to the town then continues south to rejoin the D86 at La Voulte-sur-Rhône. The D21 goes west from the town to Saint-Laurent-du-Pape. The east of the commune includes a portion of the Île Saint-Thimé in the Rhône river which is also the departmental border with Drôme. A railway line from Saint-Péray in the north to La Voulte-sur-Rhône in the south passes through the commune but there is no station in the commune. The commune consists of a large urban area along the banks of the Rhône with farmland south of the Eyrieux and forested hills for the rest.

A branch of the Rhône forms the eastern border of the commune with the main branch flowing south through the commune and continuing to eventually joining the sea at Port-Saint-Louis-du-Rhone. The Eyrieux river flows through the commune from the west to join the Rhône just south of the commune. Numerous streams rise in the commune and flow south to feed the Eyrieux including the Ruiseeau de Thouac (which forms the western border of the commune), the Ruisseau d'Abrou, and the Ruisseau de Chauvert. The Ruisseau de Feuillas flows east through the north of the commune to join the Rhône. There is a dam on the main branch of the Rhône with an electricity generating station: the Centrale Electrique de Beauchastel. Beauchastel was often the victim of floods of the Eyrieux, until the construction of a damin the upper reaches of the river in 1860.

Toponymy
Beauchastel appears as Beauchaftel on the 1750 Cassini Map and as Beauchastel on the 1790 version.

History
The commune takes its name from the castle "Bel Castrum" built in the 12th century by the Lords of Retourtour and Briand. Since ravaged by the Wars of religion, all that remains is the fortified tower that dominates the village.

In the 17th and 18th centuries Beauchastel was one of the Royal salt barns for the payment of the Gabelle of salt.

Administration

List of Successive Mayors

Demography
In 2017 the commune had 1,822 inhabitants.

Economy
Tourism (medieval village)
Fish Farming (Eyrieux valley)
Hydroelectric plant (on a branch of the Rhône)

Local Culture and Heritage

Religious Heritage
 A Church from the 19th century

Sites and Monuments
 The Bellum Castrum Medieval village. In 1179 the first lords, Retourtour and Briand, built a tower and ramparts to defend against invaders. The medieval village is built on the site of the old castle. During the Wars of religion the village was destroyed in 1622 by order of Louis XIII and the fortifications of Beauchastel were levelled; the ramparts and the defence towers disappeared. Despite these demolitions the site retained its medieval aspect enriched by architectural elements from the Renaissance until the early 20th century.
The Ancient Castle dating back to the 12th century overlooks the village. It was limited to a protective Keep with a square base of which only a section of wall remains. It was destroyed together with the village during the wars of religion.
A Church from the 18th century (1761).
The Hydroelectric plant on the Rhone

Photo gallery

See also
Communes of the Ardèche department

References

Communes of Ardèche